Koyo may be,
Koyo language (Sudan) (Lokoya)
Koyo language (Congo) (Ekoyo)